Francis Austin Harding (September 26, 1917 in Boston, Massachusetts – February 25, 1991 in Natick, Massachusetts) was an ice hockey player.  Harding was named an All-American while at Harvard University.  In 1938, he won the John Tudor Memorial Cup as the most valuable player.  He was inducted into the United States Hockey Hall of Fame in 1974.

External links 
 United States Hockey Hall of Fame bio
Massachusetts, Death Index, 1970-2003

1917 births
1991 deaths
American men's ice hockey players
Harvard Crimson men's ice hockey players
Ice hockey people from Boston
United States Hockey Hall of Fame inductees